Glenville State University (GSU) is a public college in Glenville, West Virginia.

History
Glenville State University was founded in 1872 as a branch of West Virginia Normal School. It became known as Glenville State Normal School. It served the higher education needs of Central West Virginia. By 1910, the college enrollment had exceeded the population of Glenville and grew into a full four-year college by 1931.

The Glenville State College Alumni Center, known as the John E. Arbuckle House, was listed on the National Register of Historic Places in 1991.

On February 22, 2022, Glenville State College attained university status.

Academics
The college awards bachelor's degrees, associate degrees, master's degrees, and certificates.

Athletics

In athletics, the school's sports teams are known as Pioneers and Lady Pioneers, and they compete in the Mountain East Conference. They have teams in football, basketball, track and field, softball, golf, baseball, cross country running, acrobatics & tumbling, and volleyball. The women’s basketball team won the NCAA Division II National Championship in 2022. After the women’s basketball team won the 2022 championship, their head coach Kim Stephens was named the Women’s Basketball  Coaches Association (WBCA) National Coach of the Year in Division II. Stephens was also selected as the 2022 recipient of the Fufari Award which recognizes the college coach of the year for the state of West Virginia, an award which she also won in 2019. They previously competed in the West Virginia Intercollegiate Athletic Conference, which disbanded following the 2012-13 season.

References

External links
 Official website

 
Public universities and colleges in West Virginia
Education in Gilmer County, West Virginia
Educational institutions established in 1872
Buildings and structures in Gilmer County, West Virginia
Tourist attractions in Gilmer County, West Virginia
1872 establishments in West Virginia